Yuga is a 2006 Indian Tamil-language sci-fi thriller film directed by Yaar Kannan and starring  Nassar, Richard, Manikandan, Swarnamalya, Sukumar, Jai, Raja, Santhoshi, and Bharathi. The film was produced by fifty film technicians.

Cast

 Nassar as Professor Narendran
 Richard as Sri
 Manikandan as Rishi
 Swarnamalya as Bhanu
 Sukumar as Giri
 Jai as Aravind
 Raja as Dev
 Santhoshi as Meenu
 Bharathi as Bhuvana
  Ice Ashok
 Charuhasan as Bhanu's father
 Yamuna as Elizabeth Thomas
G. K. as the assistant commissioner 
 Besant Ravi as an aghori
 King Kong as a robot
Risha in a special appearance
"Metti Oli" Shanti Srihari in a special appearance
Rakshana Maurya  in a special appearance

Production 
Nassar plays a scientist in the film. The film was shot at AVM Studios and Hotel Blue Moon. The film was supposed to have a song featuring Prabhu Deva, but he eventually did not feature.

Soundtrack
The music was composed by Dhina. Actor Simbu sang a song in the film.

Release 
S. Sudha of Rediff.com gave the film a rating of two-and-a-half out of five stars and wrote that "On the whole, a commendable effort, considering it was completed with great difficulty". Malini Mannath of Chennai Online stated that "'Yuga' neither excites nor entertains". A critic gave the film a rating of one out of five stars and called the film  "a wannabe science-fiction/horror film that is an awful combination of silly, confusing ideas, inept execution, bad acting and cheesy special effects". Another critic praised the film calling it a "nail biting thriller".

References

External links

2006 films
2000s Tamil-language films
Indian science fiction films